Amylosporus is a genus of fungi in the family Bondarzewiaceae. The genus contains five species that are widely distributed in tropical regions.

References

External links

Russulales
Russulales genera